Beast Busters is a rail shooter horror game released by SNK for arcades in 1989. It was the first three-player light gun shooter video game. Ports were released for the Amiga and Atari ST in 1990.

Gameplay 

In the game, players control one of three militiamen named Johnny Justice, Paul Patriot and Sammy Stately, who must shoot their way out of a city that has been invaded by the undead. The original arcade machine allows for up to three players to play the game at the same time. Guns are mounted to the machine and look like machine guns. Players can earn a number of power-ups through the course of each stage to aid them in battle such as rockets, grenades, armor, health packs, and ammo.

The game has seven sections for players to shoot their way through. In between stages players are shown cutscenes explaining the events of the zombie infestation that has overtaken the city. Each stage has a sub boss as well as an end boss to defeat, all of which have 2 forms to defeat. The game was known for having unusual bosses, such as a zombie punk who mutates into a dog, or a jeep which starts coming to life. One stage ends with the militiamen having to rescue a female CIA agent from that stage's boss.

Reception 
In Japan, Game Machine listed Beast Busters on their January 15, 1990 issue as being the most-successful upright arcade unit of the month. It went on to become Japan's fifth highest-grossing dedicated arcade game of 1990 and ninth highest-grossing dedicated arcade game of 1991. In North America, the game became the second top-earning arcade game in early 1990, below Teenage Mutant Ninja Turtles.

The game drew comparisons to Operation Thunderbolt, Line of Fire and SNK's own Mechanized Attack. ACE rated it 4 out of 5 and reacted positively to the game's horror theme and story, calling it Operation Wolf meets Splatterhouse.

According to Paul Theroux, Michael Jackson owned a Beast Busters arcade machine and frequently took it with him on tour via cargo plane.

Legacy 
A sequel entitled Beast Busters: Second Nightmare was released in 1999 on the Hyper Neo Geo 64.

A handheld spin-off called Dark Arms: Beast Buster was released in 1999 for the Neo Geo Pocket Color in the form of an Action RPG.

Beast Busters featuring KOF was released in December 2014 for iOS and Android devices, but it ended its service in August 2015.

See also 

 Laser Ghost

References

External links
Beast Busters at Hall of Light Amiga database

1989 video games
Activision games
Amiga games
Arcade video games
Atari ST games
Light gun games
SNK franchises
SNK games
Video games about zombies
Video games scored by Masahiko Hataya
Video games scored by Matthew Simmonds
U.S. Gold games
Cooperative video games
Video games developed in Japan